Moustafa Hamid Mansour (born 8 July 1930) is an Egyptian wrestler. He competed at the 1960 Summer Olympics and the 1964 Summer Olympics.

References

External links
 

1930 births
Possibly living people
Egyptian male sport wrestlers
Olympic wrestlers of Egypt
Wrestlers at the 1960 Summer Olympics
Wrestlers at the 1964 Summer Olympics
Sportspeople from Cairo